Following is a list of notable architects from Denmark.

A

 Lauritz Petersen Aakjær (1883–1959)
 Charles Abrahams (1838–1893)
 Eggert Achen (1853–1913)
 Vilhelm Ahlmann (1852–1928)
 Merete Ahnfeldt-Mollerup (born 1963)
 Svend Albinus (1901–1995)
 Gregers Algreen-Ussing (born 1938)
 Cornelis Altenau (died 1558)
 Hans Christian Amberg (1837–1919)
 Cornelis Altenau (died 1558)
 Einar Ambt (1877–1928)
 Carl Thorvald Andersen (1835–1916)
 Carl Andersen (1879–1967)
 Einar Andersen (1881–1957)
 Hans Carl Andersen (1871–1941)
 Ib Andersen (born 1954)
 John Andersen (born 1943)
 Ludvig Andersen (1861–1927) 
 Marinus Andersen (1895–1985)
 Rigmor Andersen (1903–1995)
 Thorvald Andersen (1883–1935)
 Stig Lennart Andersson (born 1957)
 Hans von Andorf (1570–1600)
 Georg David Anthon (1714–1781)
 Fredrik Appel (1884–1962)
 Thomas Arboe (1837–1917)
 Philip Arctander (1916–1994)
 Jens Thomas Arnfred (born 1947)
 Christian Arntzen (1852–1911)
 Niels Arp-Nielsen (1887–1970)
 Erik Asmussen (1913–1998)
 Feodor Asmussen (1887–1961)
 Svend Axelsson (born 1937)

B

 Domenicus Badiaz (flourished 1607)
 Julius Bagger (1856–1934)
 Jacob Eiler Bang (1899–1965)
 Niels Banner Mathiesen (1696–1771)
 Jean-Jacques Baruël (1923–2010)
 Nicolai Basse (flourished 1738–42)
 Nicolaus Sigismund Bauer (1720–1777)
 Povl Baumann (1878–1963)
 Thor Beenfeldt (1878–1954)
 Kristian von Bengtson (born 1974)
 Andreas Bentsen (1839–1914)
 Ivar Bentsen (1876–1943)
 Axel Berg (1856–1926)
 Richard Bergmann (1919–1970)
 Jens Bertelsen (born 1952)
 Hans Dahlerup Berthelsen (1881–1939)
 Mathias Bidstrup (1852–1929)
 Curt Bie (1896–1989)
 Michael Gottlieb Bindesbøll (1800–1856)
 Thorvald Bindesbøll (1846–1908)
 Valdemar Birkmand (1873–1930)
 Holger Bisgaard (born 1952)
 Claus Bjarrum (born 1947)
 Theo Bjerg (1936-2019)
 Acton Bjørn (1910–1992)
 Knud Blach Petersen (1919–2008)
 Mogens Black-Petersen (1917–1999)
 Leonhard Blasius (died 1644)
 Jacob Blegvad (1921–2010)
 Emil Blichfeldt (1849–1908)
 Andreas Blinkenberg
 Kay Boeck-Hansen (1920–1992)
 Christian August Bohlsmann (c. 1740–1794)
 Helge Bojsen-Møller (1874–1946)
 Ove Boldt (1905–1969)
 Ole Ejnar Bonding (1910–1989)
 Caspar Leuning Borch (1853–1910)
 Christen Borch (1883–1972)
 Martin Borch (1852–1907) 
 Gehrdt Bornebusch (1925–2011)
 Knud Borring (1838–1915)
 Ole Boye (1856–1907)
 Ellen Braae (born 1965)
 Jean Brahe (1951-2016)
 Johan Henrich Brandemann (1736–1803)
 Ernst Brandenburger (1689–c. 1713)
 Philip Brandin (1562–1594)
 Christian Brandstrup (1859–1937)
 Alfred Brandt (1873–1937)
 Gudmund Nyeland Brandt (1878–1945)
 Peter Bredsdorff (1913–1981)
 David Bretton-Meyer (1937–2015)
 Mogens Breyen (1932–2003)
 Henrik Vilhelm Brinkopff (1823–1900)
 Carl Brummer (1864–1953)
 Max Brüel (1927–1995)
 Cosmus Bræstrup (1877–1944)
 Aage Bugge (1874–1949)
 Ole Buhl (1912–1987)
 Axel Bundsen (1768–1832)
 Andreas Burmeister (1782–1815)
 Ernst Burmeister (1774–1806)
 Jørgen Buschardt (1923–2005)
 Martin Bussert (died c. 1552)
 Peter Christian Bønecke (1841–1914)
 Frederik Bøttger (1838–1920)

C

 Antoine de Bosc de la Calmette (1752–1803)
 Charles Christensen (1886–1959)
 Hans Ove Christensen (1886–1971)
 Niels Christian Christensen (1867–1939)
 Sigurd Christensen (1888–1972)
 Per Christiansen (1919–2002)
 Christian Hjerrild Clausen (1866–1941)
 Jens Christian Clausen (1835–1886)
 Ludvig Clausen (1851–1904)
 Rudolf Frimodt Clausen (1861–1950)
 Andreas Clemmensen (1852–1928)
 Karen og Ebbe Clemmensen (1917–2001) (1917–2003)
 Mogens Clemmensen (1885–1943)
 Alf Cock-Clausen (1986–1983)
 Bo Cock-Clausen (1920–2012)
 Birgit Cold (born 1936)
 August Colding (1874–1941)
 Johan Christian Conradi (1709–1779)

D

 Vilhelm Dahlerup (1826–1907)
 Andreas Dall (1886–1959)
 Hans Dall (1937–2009)
 Johan Jacob Deuntzer (1808–1875)
 John Dich (1865–1947)
 Hans von Diskow (1541–1563)
 Hans Dissing (1926–1998)
 Marten van Dochum (c. 1705–1769)
 Viggo Dorph-Petersen (1851–1937)
 Cay Dose (1702–1768)
 Frederik Draiby (1877–1966)
 Harald Drewsen (1836–1878)
 Thorvald Dreyer (1895–1980)
 Ejnar Dyggve (1887–1961)
 Palle Dyreborg (born 1938)

E

 Jens Eckersberg (1822–1891)
 Gert Edstrand (born 1929)
 Nicolai Eigtved (1701–1754)
 Axel Ekberg (1882–1935)
 Knud V. Engelhardt (1882–1931)
 Johan Conrad Ernst (1666–1750)
 Troels Erstad (1911–1949)
 Erik Erstad-Jørgensen (1871–1945)
 Hector Estrup (1854–1904)
 Marco Evaristti (born 1963)
 Inger and Johannes Exner (born 1926) (1926–2015)

F

 Tobias Faber (1915–2010)
 Jørn Fabricius (1936)
 Joachim Fagerlund (1859–1933)
 Ole Falkentorp (1886–1948)
 Jean Fehmerling (1912–1978)
 Joseph Carl Julien de Feignet (1698–1771)
 Sven Felding (1944)
 Axel Feldinger (1893–1967)
 Ludvig Fenger (1833–1905)
 Dan Fink (1908–1998)
 Jep Fink (1882–1973)
 Arne Finsen (1890–1945)
 Helge Finsen (1897–1976)
 Egil Fischer (1878–1963)
 Vilhelm Fischer (1868–1914)
 Kay Fisker (1893–1965)
 Emanuel Christel Fleischer (1850–1911)
 Christian Flindt (born 1972)
 Jacob Fortling (1711–1761)
 Svend Fournais (1907–1984)
 Georg Juul Frankel (1893–1955)
 Otto Frankild (born 1918)
 Anton Frederiksen (1884–1967)
 Erik Ellegaard Frederiksen (1924–1997)
 Johannes Frederiksen (1881–1960)
 Vilhelm Friederichsen (1841–1913)
 Frederik Ferdinand Friis (1793–1865)
 Knud Friis (1926–2010)
 Jacob Wilhelm Frohne (1832–1909)
 Ove Funch-Espersen (1883–1964)
 Andreas Fussing (1871–1958)
 Christian Fussing (1852–1907)
 Christian Fussing (1878–1930)
 Hans Fussing (1838–1914)

G

 Arne Gaardmand (1926–2008)
 Harald Gad (1884–1940)
 Frode Galatius (1890–1977)
 Harald Garde (1861–1933)
 Hans Christopher Gedde (1738–1817)
 Samuel Christoph Gedde (1691–1766)
 Jan Gehl (born 1936)
 Albert Gjellerup (1845–1935)
 Carl Ludvig Gjellerup (1796–1876)
 Carl Oluf Gjerløv-Knudsen (1892–1980)
 Carl Einar Glahn (1884–1971)
 Henrik Christopher Glahn (1850–1931)
 Otto Glahn (1813–1879)
 Edvard Glæsel (1858–1915)
 Henri Glæsel (1853–1921)
 Johannes Emil Gnudtzmann (1837–1922)
 Kristen Gording (1880–1950)
 Niels Gotenborg (1878–1964)
 Kaj Gottlob (1887–1976)
 Olaus Gram (1779–1827)
 Peter Andreas Rosenkilde Gram (1883–1968)
 Peder Gram (1885–1937)
 Sophus Greiffenberg (1876–1940)
 Vilhelm Groth-Hansen (1898–1967)
 Ragna Grubb (1903–1961)
 Flemming Grut (1911–1987)
 Torben Grut (1871–1945)
 Ejner Graae (1914–1989)
 Lorentz Poul Gudme (1861–1934)
 Joseph Guione (1746–1808)
 Thorvald Gundestrup (1869–1931)
 Oscar Gundlach-Pedersen (1886–1960)
 Niels Peter Pedersen Gundstrup (1877–1949)
 Halldor Gunnløgsson (1918–1985)
 Nicolai Gyntelberg (1626–1661)

H 

 Henrik Hagemann (1845–1910) 
 Peter Heinrich Christoph Hagemann (1810–1853) 
 Gustav Bartholin Hagen (1873–1941) 
 Ole Hagen (1913–1984)
 Andreas Hagerup (1856–1919)  
 Andreas Hallander (1755–1828)
 Valdemar Hansen Hammer (1866–1943)
 Christian Frederik Hansen (1756–1845)
 Christian Hansen (1803–1883)
 Claudius Hansen (b. 1888–?)
 Frederik Carl Christian Hansen (1858–1923)
 Hans Hansen (1899–1958)
 Hans Christian Hansen (1901–1978)
 Hans Henning Hansen (1916–1985)
 Hans Munk Hansen (born 1929)
 Heinrich Hansen (1860–1942)
 Henning Hansen (1880–1945)
 Isaak Hansen (1788–1852)
 Matthias Hansen (1781–1850)
 Nicolai Hansen (1870–1899)
 Preben Hansen (1908–1989) 
 Theophilus Hansen (1813–1891)
 Carl Harild (1868–1932)
 Christoffer Harlang (born 1958)
 Caspar Frederik Harsdorff (1735–1799)
 Philip Hartmann (1710–1779)
 Jørgen Hartmann-Petersen (1920–2012)
 Eigil Hartvig Rasmussen (1905–1980)
 Harald Hauberg (1883–1956)
 Niels Hauberg (1885–1952)
 Hans Andreas Wilhelm Haugsted (1832–1912)  
 Anton Haunstrup (1862–1926)
 Elias David Häusser (1687–1745)
 Malene Hauxner (1942–2012)
 Lambert van Haven (1630–1695)
 Thomas Havning (1891–1976)  
 Alan Havsteen-Mikkelsen (1938–2002) 
 Edvard Heiberg (1911–2000)
 Henning Helger (1912–1989)
 Bent Helweg-Møller (1883–1956)
 Poul Henningsen (1894–1967)
 Simon P. Henningsen (1920–1974)
 Thorkild Henningsen (1884–1931)
 Michael Johan Herbst (1699–1762)
 Johan Daniel Herholdt (1818–1902) 
 Gustav Friedrich Hetsch (1788–1864)
 Therkel Hjejle (1884–1927)
 Elliot Hjuler (1893–1968)
 Johann Gottfried Hödrich (baptized 1697–c. 1745)
 Povl Ernst Hoff (1903–1992)
 Gottfried Hoffmann (1630–1687)
 Vilhelm Holck (1856–1936)
 Georg Holgreen (1795–1843)
 Hans Jørgen Holm (1835–1916)
 Mads Schifter Holm (1800–1874)
 Knud Holscher (born 1930)
 Niels Peder Christian Holsøe (1826–1895) 
 Poul Holsøe (1873–1966)
 Christian Bernhard Hornbech (1772–1855)
 Ove Hove (1914–1993)
 Gunnar Hoydal (born 1941)
 Vilhelm Hvalsøe (1883–1958)
 Tyge Hvass (1885–1963)
 Peter Hvidt (1916–1986) 
 Louis Hygom (1879–1950)
 Axel Høeg-Hansen (1877–1947)

I

 Anna Maria Indrio (born 1943)
 Bjarke Ingels (born 1974)
 Bernhard Ingemann (1789–1862)
 Poul Ingemann (born 1952)
 Valdemar Ingemann (1840–1911)
 Jens Ingwersen (1871–1956)
 Mogens Irming (1915–1993)
 Kristian Isager (born 1946)

J

 Arne Jacobsen (1902–1971)
 Holger Jacobsen (1876–1960)
 Lorentz Jacobsen (1721–1779)
 Mogens Jacobsen (1911–1970)
 Niels Jacobsen (1865–1935)
 Ewert Janssen (died 1692)
 Nicolas-Henri Jardin (1720–1799)
 Peder Vilhelm Jensen-Klint (1853–1930)
 Albert Jensen (1847–1913)
 Ferdinand Vilhelm Jensen (1837–1890)
 Ib Martin Jensen (1906–1979)
 Jens Jensen (1860–1951)
 Louis Jensen (born 1943)
 Peder Boas Jensen (born 1935)
 Rasmus Jensen (1863–1924)
 Emil Jeppesen (1851–1934)
 Louis Jeppesen (1876–1944)
 Carsten Juel-Christiansen (born 1944)
 Boye Junge (1697–1778)
 Johan Boye Junge (1735–1807)
 Helle Juul (born 1954)
 Alf Jørgensen (1878–1923)
 :da:Emil Jørgensen (1858–1942)
 Eugen Jørgensen (1858–1910)
 Frode Jørgensen (1903–1988)
 Henning Jørgensen (1883–1973)|
 Thorvald Jørgensen (1867–1946)
 Waldemar Jørgensen (1883–1955)

K

 Andreas Dobert Kalleberg (1772–1827)
 Christian Kampmann (1890–1955)
 Hack Kampmann (1856–1920)
 Hans Jørgen Kampmann (1889–1966)
 Otto Käszner (1938–2019)
 Andreas Kirkerup (1749–1810)
 Frederik Kiørboe (1878–1952)
 Marius Kjeldsen (1924–2004)
 Hjalmar Kjær (1872–1933)
 Werner Kjær (1924–1998)
 August Klein (1870–1913)
 Viggo Klein (1850–1913)
 Vilhelm Klein (1835–1913)
 Kaare Klint (1888–1954)
 Naur Klint (1920–1978)
 Jens Klok (1889–1974)
 Kenneth Knudsen (born 1946)
 Ludvig Knudsen (1843–1924)
 Sylvius Knutzen (1870–1939)
 Fritz Koch (1857–1905)
 Hans Koch (1893–1945)
 Jørgen Hansen Koch (1787–1860)
 Mogens Koch (1898–1992)
 Peter Koch (1905–1980)
 Valdemar Koch (1852–1902)
 Jens Christian Kofoed (1864–1941)
 Eva og Nils Koppel (1916–2006) (1914–2009) 
 Peter Kornerup (1794–1875)
 Ole Kornerup-Bang (1917–2000)
 Erik Korshagen (1926–2005)
 Johan Cornelius Krieger (1683–1755)
 Svenn Eske Kristensen (1905–2000)
 Arnold Krog (1856–1931)
 Gunnar Krohn (1914–2005)
 Anders Kruuse (1745–1811)
 Ernst Kühn (1890–1948)
 Sophus Frederik Kühnel (1851–1930)

L

 Osvald Rosendahl Langballe (1859–1930)
 Carl Lange (1828–1900)
 Philip Lange (1756–1805)
 Philip de Lange (1705–1766)
 Aage Langeland-Mathiesen (1868–1933)
 Hans Erling Langkilde (1906–1997)
 Christen Larsen (1857–1930)
 Henning Larsen (1925–2013)
 Karl Larsen (1892–1958)
 Flemming Lassen (1902–1984)
 Mogens Lassen (1901–1987)
 Aage Sigurd Kjeldgaard Lauritzen (1871–1961)
 Vilhelm Lauritzen (1894–1984)
 Jens Laustsen (1890–?)
 David Wilhelm Leerbeck (1855–1904)
 Alfred Oscar Leffland (1848–1924)
 Søren Lemche (1864–1955)
 Carl Lendorf (1839–1918)
 Vincents Lerche (1666–1742)
 Frederik Lauritz Levy (1851–1924)
 Joseph Christian Lillie (1760–1827)
 Jens Lindhe (born 1958)
 Hans von Linstow (1787–1851)
 Ernst Lohse (1944–1994)
 Jean Baptiste Descarriéres de Longueville (1699–1766)
 Knud Andersen Ludvigsen (1866–?)
 Annemarie Lund (born 1948)
 Frederik Christian Lund (1896–1984)
 Lene Dammand Lund (born 1963)
 Søren Robert Lund (1962)
 Ib Lunding (1895–1983)
 Carl Lundquist (1891–1916)
 Tage Lyneborg (1946-2020)
 Curt von Lüttichau (1897–1991)
 Charles Æmilius von Lützow (1683–1749)
 Gunnar Laage (1876–1948)
 Julius Bentley Løffler (1843–1904)
 Harald Lønborg-Jensen (1871–1948)
 Aage Lønborg-Jensen (1877–1938)

M

 Einar Madvig (1882–1952)
 Boye Magens (1748–1814)
 Peder Malling (1865–1952)
 Dorte Mandrup (born 1961)
 Christian Mandrup-Poulsen (1865–1952)
 Ove Mandrup-Poulsen (1899–1984)
 Poul Mangor (1918–2007)
 Johan Ludvig Mansa (1740–1820)
 Sophus Marstrand (1860–1946)
 Vilhelm Marstrand (1810–1873)
 Kent Martinussen (born 1960)
 Albertus Mathiesen (1660-1668)
 Pia Bech Mathiesen (1962-2016)
 Paul Staffeldt Matthiesen (1891–1979)
 Ferdinand Meldahl (1827–1908)
 Heinrich Meldahl (1776–1840)
 Grethe Meyer (1918–2008)
 Sonja Meyer (1898–1981)
 Peter Meyn (1749–1808)
 Knud Millech (1890–1980)
 Ejnar Mindedal (1892–1975)
 Alfred Mogensen (1900–1986)
 Tyge Mollerup (1888–1953)
 Ole Peter Momme (1854–1899)
 Emanuel Monberg (1877–1938)
 Niels Christensen Monberg (1856–1930)
 Johann Hermann von Motz (1743–1829)
 Knud Munk (1936-2016)
 Otto Johann Müller (1692–1762)
 Axel Maar (1888–1978)
 Orla Mølgaard-Nielsen (1907–1993)
 Axel Møller (1862–1943)
 C. F. Møller (1898–1988)
 Elna Møller (1913–1994)
 Erik Møller (1909–2002)
 Georg Ebbe Wineken Møller (1840–1897)
 Thorkel Møller (1868–1946)
 Viggo Sten Møller (1897–1990)
 Jens Møller-Jensen (1869–1948)
 Viggo Møller-Jensen (1907–2003)
 Ejvind Mørch (1873–1962)
 Volmer Johannes Mørk-Hansen (1856–1929)
 Christian Jensen Mørup (1732–1800)

N

 Børge Nagel (1921–2004)
 Johan Henrik Nebelong (1817–1871)
 Niels Sigfred Nebelong (1806–1871)
 Skjold Neckelmann (1854–1903)
 August J. Nielsen (1890–1960)
 Christian Vilhelm Nielsen (1833–1910)
 Christian Frühstück Nielsen (1878–1956)
 Hans Peter Svendler Nielsen (born 1954)
 Jens Nielsen (1937–1992)
 Johan Nielsen (1863–1952)
 Johannes Magdahl Nielsen (1862–1941)
 Kim Herforth Nielsen (born 1954)
 Peter Nielsen (1886–1969)
 Viggo Berner Nielsen (1889–1966)
 Viggo Norn (1879–1967)
 Einar Johannes Norup (1875–1951)
 Cajus Novi (1878–1965)
 Victor Nyebølle (1862–1933)
 Stephan Peter Nyeland (1845–1922)
 Martin Nyrop (1849–1921)
 Hans Næss (1723–1795)

O

 Anthonis van Obbergen (1543–1611)
 Hercules von Oberberg (1517–1602)
 C.E.D. von Oetken (c. 1691–1754)
 Tage Olivarius (1847–1905)
 Christian Olrik (1881–1944)
 Johannes Martin Olsen (1881–1959)
 Albert Oppenheim (1879–1956)
 Einar Ørnsholt (1887–1978)
 Henning Ortmann (1901–1976)

P

 Einar Packness (1879–1952)
 Georg Palludan (1889–1964)
 Hother A. Paludan (1871–1956)
 Johannes Paludan (1912–2001)
 Marius Pedersen (1888–1965)
 Domenico Pelli (1657–1728)
 Jørgen Pers (born 1933)
 Aksel Petersen (1897–1953)
 Carl Petersen (1874–1923)
 Ernst Petersen (1883–1953)
 Gunnar Biilmann Petersen (1897–1968)
 Harald Petersen (1890–1954)
 Jens Vilhelm Petersen (1851–1931)
 Knud Arne Petersen (1862–1943)
 Knud Lehn Petersen (1890–1974)
 Ludvig Petersen (1848–1935)
 Ove Petersen (1830–1892)
 Vilhelm Petersen (1830–1913)
 Olaf Petri (1875–1946)
 Ernst Peymann (1737–1823)
 Georg Pfaff (1886–1954)
 Christian Carl Pflueg (1728–1809)
 Andreas Pfützner (1741–1793)
 Johan Andreas Pfützner (1708–1764)
 Holger Pind (1899–1988)
 Wilhelm Friedrich von Platen (1667–1732)
 Bent von Platen-Hallermund (1922–2013)
 Ulrik Plesner (1861–1933)
 Ulrik Adolph Plesner (1861–1933)
 Camilla Plum (born 1956)
 Harald Plum (1881–1929)
 Georg Ponsaing (1889–1981)
 Gerhardt Poulsen (1883–1918)
 Axel Preisler (1871–1930)
 Alexis J. Prior (1877–1955)
 Vilhelm Puck (1844–1926)
 Vilhelm Puck (1882–1954)
 Hans van Paeschen (1561–1582)

Q
 Johan Martin Quist (1755–1818)

R

 Aage Rafn (1890–1953)
 Hans Rahlff (1897–1975)
 Børge Rammeskow (1911–2009)
 Svend Ramsby (1902–1976)
 Carl Ferdinand Rasmussen (1831–1903)
 Holger Rasmussen (1871–1952)
 Ib og Jørgen Rasmussen (1931-2017)
 Poul C. Rasmussen (1885–1965)
 Steen Eiler Rasmussen (1898–1990)
 Alfred Råvad (1848–1933)
 Jørgen Henrich Rawert (1751–1823)
 Johan Richter (1925–1998)
 Nicolaus Hinrich Rieman (died 1759)
 Sven Risom (1880–1971)
 Gerhard Rønne (1879–1955)
 Anton Rosen (1859–1928)
 Georg Erdman Rosenberg (1739–1788)
 Johann Gottfried Rosenberg (1709–1776)
 Niels Rosenkjær (1886–1928)
 Einar Rosenstand (1887–1953)
 Rudolph Rothe (1802–1877)
 Aage Roussell (1901–1972)
 Rasmus Rue (1863–1944)
 Henrik Rysensteen (1624–1679)
 Hans Rustad (1759–1832)

S

 Harald Salling-Mortensen (1902–1969)
 Valdemar Sander (1876–1975)
 Hans Scheving (born 1958)
 Erik Schiødte (1849–1909)
 Carl Schiøtz (1877–1938) (1877–1938)
 Frits Schlegel (1896–1965)
 Ole Jørgen Schmidt (1793–1848)
 Valdemar Schmidt (1864–1944)
 Olaf Schmidth (1857–1927)
 Charles I. Schou (1884–1973)
 Rolf Schroeder (1872–1948)
 Hans Wilhelm Schrøder (1810–1888)
 Johan Schrøder (1836–1914)
 Kay Schrøder (1877–1949)
 Emil Schwanenflügel (1847–1921)
 Ib Schwanenflügel (Flourished 1960)
 Christian Seemann (1840–1920)
 Knud Tanggaard Seest (1879–1972)
 Bernhard Seidelin (1820–1863)
 Conrad Seidelin (1809–1878)
 Jørgen Selchau (1923–1997)
 Bent Severin (1925–2012)
 Henrik Steffens Sibbern (1826–1901)
 Svend Sinding (1881–1929)
 Alfred Skjøt-Pedersen (1897–1979)
 Hans Georg Skovgaard (1898–1969)
 Poul Erik Skriver (1918-2016)
 Morten Skøt (1886–1937)
 Carl Martin Smidt (1872–1947)
 Philip Smidth (1855–1938)
 Julius Smith (1861–1943)
 Johann Adam Soherr (1706–1778)
 Carl Theodor Sørensen (1893–1979)
 Erik Christian Sørensen (1922–2011)
 Holger Sørensen (1913–1981)
 Theodor Sørensen (1825–1867)
 Thorvald Sørensen (1902–1973) 
 Johan Otto von Spreckelsen (1929–1987)
 Claus Stallknecht (1681–1734)
 Hans van Steenwinckel the Elder (1550–1601)
 Hans van Steenwinckel the Younger (1587–1639)
 Hans van Steenwinckel the Youngest (1639–1700)
 Povl Stegmann (1888–1944) 
 Hakon Stephensen (1900–1986)
 Jon Stephensen (born 1959)
 Harald Conrad Stilling (1815–1891)
 Willads Stilling (1752–1831)
 J.A. Stillmann (1822–1875)
 Hermann Baagøe Storck (1839–1922)
 Dan Stubbergaard (born 1974)
 Theodor Stuckenberg (1835–1901)
 Jørgen Stærmose (1920–2007)
 Palle Suenson (1904–1987)
 Christian Sylow (1866–1930)

T

 Johannes Strøm Tejsen (1878–1950)
 Hans-Georg Tersling (1857–1920)
 Leopold Teschl (1911–1989)
 Andreas Thejll (1852–1908)
 Ferdinand Thielemann (1803–1863)
 T.A. Thierry (1873–1953)
 Lars Juel Thiis (1955–2005)
 Julius Tholle (1831–1871)
 Alfred Thomsen (1853–1934)
 C.F. Thomsen (1855–1926)
 Edvard Thomsen (1884–1980)
 Carl Thonning (1855–1926)
 Christian Frederik Thorin (1801–1829)
 William August Thulstrup (1820–1898)
 Laurids de Thurah (1706–1759)
 Christian L. Thuren (1846–1926)
 Ejnar Thuren (1877–1936)
 Christian Tyge Tillisch (1903–1992)
 Holger Tornøe (1881–1967)
 Lene Tranberg (born 1956)
 Ibi Trier Mørch (1910–1980)
 Niels Frithiof Truelsen (born 1938)
 Georg Tschierske (1699–1753)
 Georg Dietrich Tschierske (Flourished 1749–1780)
 Kai Turin (1885–1935)
 Marcus Tuscher (1705–1751)
 Gotfred Tvede (1863–1947)
 Jesper Tvede (1879–1934)
 Vilhelm Tvede (1826–1891)
 Christian Tybjerg (1815–1879)

U

 Bertel Udsen (1918–1992)
 Frits Uldall (1839–1921)
 Rudolf Unmack (1834–1909)
 Kjeld Ussing (1913–1977)
 Susanne Ussing (1940–1998)
 Jørn Utzon (1918–2008)

V

 Henrik Valeur (born 1966)  
 Kristoffer Varming (1865–1936)
 Michael Varming (1939–2008)
 Søren Vig-Nielsen (1876–1964)
 Kjeld Vindum (born 1950)
 Mogens Voltelen (1908–1995)

W

 Allan de Waal (1938–2012)
 Jens Peter Jensen Wærum (1855–1926)
 Arne Wagner Smitt (1910–1976)
 Frederik Wagner (1880–1946)
 Vilhelm Theodor Walther (1819–1892)
 Niels Wamberg (born 1938)
 Axel Wanscher (1902–1973)
 Ole Wanscher (1903–1985)
 Theodor Wedén (1848–1931)
 Robert Wehage (1900–?)
 Otto Weitling (1930–?)
 Heinrich Wenck (1851–1936)
 Carl Emil Wessel (1831–1867)
 Noah Danø Whitehorn (born 1975)
 Lone Wiggers (born 1963)
 Claudius August Wiinholt (1855–1905)
 Hans Wilhardt (1907–1985)
 Bennet Windinge (1905–1986)
 Laurits Albert Winstrup (1815–1889)
 Arthur Wittmaack (1878–1965)
 Georg Wittrock (1843–1911)
 Vilhelm Wohlert (1920–2007)
 Vilhelm Carl Heinrich Wolf (1833–1893)
 Henning Wolff (1828–1880)
 Carl Wolmar (1876–1957)
 Hans Wright (1854–1925)

Z

 Hans Christian Zeltner (1826–1889)
 Otto F. Zeltner (1858–1923)
 Theodor Zeltner (1822–1904)
 Samuel Zimmermann (Flourished 1748–1757)
 Jens Giødvad Zinn (1836–1926)
 Christian Joseph Zuber (1736–1802)
 Joseph Zuber (1705–1771)
 Martin Zumpe (1697–1753)
 Christian Zwingmann (1827–1891)

See also

 Architecture of Denmark
 Bibliography of Danish architecture
 List of architects
 List of Danish architectural firms
 List of Danes

References
 Weilbachs Kunstnerleksikon

Denmark
Architects